The ten litų note (LTL 10) was the lowest value of Lithuanian banknotes and has been used since 1922 when Lithuania became independent from German forces after World War I.

The note measures 135x65mm, just like all banknotes in Lithuania. The ten litų banknotes show the flight of airplane Lituanica by Steponas Darius and Stasys Girėnas.

Word litų is a genitive case of word litai, which is plural of litas. Plural genitive case is used with decimal numbers (10, 20, 50 and so on).

History 

The first litas was introduced on October 2, 1922, replacing the ostmark and ostrubel, both of which had been issued by the occupying German forces during World War I. 1 US dollar valued 10 litų.
In 1941, litas disappeared for the first time. The litas was replaced by the Soviet ruble in April 1941 after Lithuania was annexed by the Soviet Union. Litas was issued again in 1992.

Banknote was released four times (in 1993 (twice), 1997, and 2001).

Since 2007 the ten litų note became the lowest nomination note, when one, two and five litų notes were phased out.

Design 

The ten litų note is at 136 millimeters (5.4 in) × 65 millimeters (2.5 in) with a dark blue color scheme.

Like all Lithuanian banknotes, the ten litų note shows famous people on the obverse and famous places or buildings on the reverse. Front side of the note portrays two Lithuanian aviators Steponas Darius and Stasys Girėnas. They are famous for their Lituanica flight. In 1933 pilots flew from New York City over the Atlantic Ocean to Kaunas. After successfully flying 6,411 km, however, it crashed, due to undetermined circumstances, 650 km from its destination. Both of the aviators died.
The reverse of the banknote shows Lituanica flying over the Atlantic Ocean.

Also obverse has big number 10, the year of issue 2007, the signature of the Chairman of the Board of the Bank of Lithuania and the inscription LIETUVOS BANKO VALDYBOS PIRMININKAS (CHAIRMAN OF THE BOARD OF THE BANK OF LITHUANIA) on the left of the portraits. Obverse doesn't have the coat of arms, but the reverse has it on the right corner.

Security features 

New notable security features of the banknote: 
 A strip printed in iridescent inks to the right of the portraits visible when the banknotes are tilted towards the light at an acute angle, with emerging inscription LTL 10.
 Latent numerals – the denomination numeral 10 printed twice on the iridescent strip, which becomes visible when tilting the banknote to the light at an acute angle.
Note the new 10 litas banknotes of 2007 issue do not have a microperforated numeral 10.

Other security features:
Special paper of white colour characterised by a specific crackle, non-fluorescent under ultraviolet light.
Watermark – a multi-tonal Vytis (state emblem, a mounted knight) visible when the note is held up to the light.
A security thread with the repeated microtext 10 LTL, fluorescent under ultraviolet light in rainbow colours.
The new 10 litas banknotes of 2007 issue do not have a microperforated numeral 10.
See-through feature front to back in perfect register in the shape of an aeroplane.
The recognition sign for the blind – a raised isosceles triangle.
Raised intaglio printing of the portraits, ornamental bands, inscriptions and denomination numerals on the front provides a tactile surface easily distinguished by touch.
Latent image (denomination numeral 10) on the right side of the top ornamental band visible when the note is tilted towards the light at the acute angle.
White lines on intaglio printed inscriptions LIETUVOS BANKAS, DEŠIMT LITŲ and denomination numerals.
A repeated microtext 10 LTL printed between and on both sides of the portraits.
A repeated microtext LIETUVOS BANKAS above the bottom ornamental band on the front and on the vertical edges of the security line structure on the back.
Microtexts Lituanica and NR 688 E on the body and tail of the plane.
Elements (front and back) intended for the anti-colour copier protection: multicoloured top and bottom edges of the banknote, security line structure, specific fine line patterns.
Invisible fibres embedded in the paper fluorescent under ultraviolet light in blue, green and red.
The outline of the orange numeral 10 fluorescent under ultraviolet light in brownish yellow.
Vertical serial number fluorescent under ultraviolet light in green.
Two numerals 10 printed in invisible inks fluorescent under ultraviolet light in brownish yellow.

References 

Currencies of Lithuania
Ten-base-unit banknotes